École secondaire Calixa-Lavallée is a francophone public secondary school located in the borough of Montréal-Nord, Montreal, Quebec.  Part of the Commission scolaire de la Pointe-de-l'Île (CSPI), it was originally in the catholic School board Commission des écoles catholiques de Montréal(CECM) before the 1998 reorganization of School boards from religious communities into linguistic communities in Quebec. In 1998, along with some other schools in the eastern portion of CECM, it was transferred into the territory of the former Commission scolaire Jérôme-Le Royer, which was replaced by CSPI. École secondaire Calixa-Lavallée offers regular and special education programs, welcoming classes and also professional and adults programs. This school hosts actually 1 661 students and 132 teachers.

History
The school opened in 1969 and was one of the first « polyvalente » in Quebec. In 1967, the ministère de l'Éducation du Québec implement the concept of « écoles polyvalentes » arising from the Parent Commission Report published between 1963 and 1966. Two factors have contributed to the creation of those schools all over Quebec: baby-boomers and urban sprawl. This type of polyvalent schools involve two elements: general education and professional education. Those schools originated from the School Reform in Quebec that puts forward an open education driven by a system based on collaboration, flexibility and openness inside the school.

The school has mandatory school uniforms.  some students were recent immigrants from Haiti. Many students came from a background of poverty. Caroline Touzin of La Presse stated that many students said openly that they wanted to become procurers of prostitutes ("pimps" if male). According to Touzin, the teachers have the school "tattooed on their hearts" despite the socioeconomic challenges there.

The Campus
The establishment has six stories in a straight building connected to a services block all in raw concrete building « brutalist style » with mostly windows in every classroom. It contains mainly regular classrooms, rooms for professional education, computer labs, science labs, plastic art workshops, a music room, a cafeteria, a student café and a library. The Sports Complex comprises 5 gymnasiums and a 25 m swimming pool. Also, we can find outdoor facilities such as a 400 m running track, a basketball court, 2 basketball practice pitches, 4 tennis courts, two soccer fields and, in the Sauvé park nearby, a baseball field and 3 tennis courts.

Programs and Services
Besides the regular program, the school offers specialized programs. The technical and professional education offers courses focused on employment or professional education. The professional education at the École hôtelière de Montréal Calixa-Lavallée offers retail butchery, bakery, cookery, pastry, restaurant service and market cuisine courses. The Calixa-Lavallée professional education Center offers computer graphics, printing and business launch classes.

Many others professional services are offered to the students: nurse, psychologist, social worker, guidance counsellor, psychoeducator, counsellor in spiritual life and community involvement, leisure technician, special education technician, intervention worker for student retention, etc. Finally, a homework assistance program is offered after school from former students.

Student life

Sports
Basketball
Cheerleading
Flag football
Futsal
Cosom hockey
Ping-pong
Racing Club
Swimming
Soccer
Track and field
Volleyball
Weight training

Cultural life
Arts exhibition
Dance
Harmony Band
Improvisational Theatre
Musical Theatre
Reading Club
Singing
Student Radio

Events
School Prom
Graduation Ceremonies
Concerts
Science Exhibition
Back-to-school Party
Meritas Gala
Sports Gala
Sugar schack trip
Theme days
Peer Helpers
Multicultural activities
Theatre
Museum Visits
Cultural Trips

Notable students
Luguentz Dort, NBA basketball player;
Mariana Mazza, humorist;
Will Prosper, civil rights activist.

References

External links
 École secondaire Calixa-Lavallée 

High schools in Montreal
1969 establishments in Quebec
Educational institutions established in 1969